Da-that Island is an unpopulated island in Myanmar. It is located around 15 miles from Ye, Mon State.

References

Islands of Myanmar